The School of Civil and Environmental Engineering (SCEE) was founded by the National University of Sciences and Technology, Pakistan in 2008 by merging four established institutes; NUST Institute of Civil Engineering, National Institute of Transportation, Institute of Geographical Information System and Institute of Environmental Sciences and Engineering.

The school is co-educational and offers undergraduate and postgraduate programs in the fields of Civil Engineering and Environmental Engineering.

History
National Institute of Transportation (NIT) was established in 1991 at the Risalpur campus of National University of Sciences and Technology, Pakistan and was affiliated with Military College of Engineering (Pakistan). The institute initially provided undergraduate and postgraduate programs in the fields of Transportation Engineering, Geotechnical engineering, Structural Engineering and Water Resources Engineering.
 
Institute of Environmental Sciences and Engineering (IESE) started its MS in Environmental Engineering in July 1996. Later, PhD programs were also offered.

With the establishment of the new campus of NUST in Islamabad in 2008, NIT was merged with IESE and Institute of Geographical Information System and given the name of School of Civil and Environmental Engineering (SCEE).

The school consists of four institutes; NUST Institute of Civil Engineering, Institute of Environmental Science & Engineering, Institute of Geographical Information Systems and National Institute of Transportation.

Foreign collaborations

Industry linkages
SCEE has encouraged the local industries, both in the public and private sectors, to collaborate with the institute’s researchers. This industry-university partnership includes faculty interaction with industries and solution to industrial problems through R&D projects.

University linkages
SCEE has collaborations in the field of research and development with the following universities:
Michigan State University, USA
University of Michigan, Ann Arbor, USA
Georgia Institute of Technology, USA
Iowa State University, USA
Cornell University, USA
University of Illinois, USA
McGill University, Montreal, Canada
Cranfield University, UK
The University of Manchester, UK
University of New South Wales, Australia
Nanyang Technological University, Singapore
National University of Singapore
Asian Institute of Technology, Bangkok, Thailand
Graduate University of the Chinese Academy of Sciences, China

See also
NUST Institute of Civil Engineering
Institute of Geographical Information System
Institute of Environmental Sciences and Engineering
National University of Sciences and Technology, Pakistan

External links
 SCEE official website
 NUST official website

National University of Sciences & Technology
Engineering universities and colleges in Pakistan